Justice Lockwood may refer to:

Alfred C. Lockwood, chief justice of the Arizona Supreme Court
Lorna E. Lockwood, associate justice of the Arizona Supreme Court
Samuel D. Lockwood, associate justice of the Illinois Supreme Court
William F. Lockwood, associate justice of the Nebraska Supreme Court